Aggie Guerard Rodgers is an American costume designer. She was nominated for an Academy Award in the category Best Costume Design for the film The Color Purple. She also was also the costume designer on the film Beetlejuice.

Selected filmography 
 The Color Purple (1985)

References

External links 

Living people
People from Fresno, California
Year of birth missing (living people)
American costume designers
21st-century American women